These are the Municipal districts created in Quebec on 15 April, 1841, from a proclamation of governor Sydenham. They were replaced by parish and township municipalities in 1845.

Districts 
 Municipal district of Beauharnois.
 Municipal district of Berthier.
 Municipal district of Bonaventure.
 Municipal district of Chaudière.
 Municipal district of Dorchester.
 Municipal district of Gaspé.
 Municipal district of Kamouraska.
 Municipal district of Lac-des-Deux-Montagnes.
 Municipal district of Leinster.
 Municipal district of Missisquoi.
 Municipal district of Montréal.
 Municipal district of Nicolet.
 Municipal district of Portneuf.
 Municipal district of Quebec.
 Municipal district of Richelieu.
 Municipal district of Rimouski.
 Municipal district of Saguenay.
 Municipal district of Saint-Hyacinthe.
 Municipal district of Saint-Jean.
 Municipal district of Saint-Thomas.
 Municipal district of Sherbrooke.
 Municipal district of Sydenham.
 Municipal district of Terrebonne.
 Municipal district of Trois-Rivières.

External links 
 Paroisses et municipalités de la région de Montréal au XIXe siècle, 1825-1861
 Gazette du Canada, 1841

Local government in Quebec
Political history of Quebec
1841 establishments in Canada
1845 disestablishments
1840s in Canada